Christopher (Chris) Curry or Currie may refer to:

 Christopher Curry (born 1946), British businessman
 Christopher Curry (actor) (born 1948), American actor
 Chris Curry, the pen name of Tamara Thorne (born 1957), American writer.
 Chris Currie, the victim of a 2005 manslaughter in New Zealand